Islamia Collegiate School  is a school in Peshawar, Khyber Pakhtunkhwa, Pakistan, founded in 1913 by Sahibzada Abdul Qayyum and Sir George Roose Keppel. It is a part of Islamia College Peshawar.

The School has a history of over hundred years. 

Dr. Abdul Qadeer Khan (late) "The father of Pakistan's atomic weapon program" also paid a visit to the school.

References 

Schools in Peshawar